Prospero is a Canadian industrial/rhythmic noise band based in Toronto, Canada. Born as a solo project in August 2001 under musician and DJ Wade Anderson, Prospero’s music fuses traditional industrial electronics with a variety of acoustic percussion and exotic instruments.  Since 2011 and the addition of Steve Sandford (aka Hangedman) the band has evolved into a two man act with heavy influences from tribal noise, IDM, neofolk and other post-industrial music movements.

History

2000–2010 Anderson solo period

In 2001, Local Toronto DJ Wade Anderson co-founded sub.session.records, and released Prospero's debut limited edition CDr A Storm is Coming.
Prospero's formative second release, Spreading the Infection, was released in 2004 was a double CD split release between sub.session media and France's Brume Records. 
In 2008 Prospero signed to Toronto-based Artoffact Records release his third CD, Folie à Deux, which contained collaborations with Ayria, Battery Cage, It-clings, and Terrorfakt.

In the first decade Prospero contributed tracks to a number of compilations, including Sub.Session and Duo.Tone released by sub.session.records; Saturation Bombing I and II and [tik]co:man:d[sic] by TIK Recordings.

As Prospero, Anderson has remixed tracks for other notable rhythmic noise artists such as Empusae, s:cage, and Converter as well as playing several industrial festivals, most notably the COMA festivals in Canada.  Prospero's early years were marked by a musical style that incorporated dramatic post apocalyptic themes, arpeggiated synths lines and heavy industrial percussion characteristic of the rhythmic noise genre.

2011–2014 Turning Point

In 2011 Prospero released its fourth full length album Turning Point, a 14 track release with remixes by Fractured, Mara's Torment and most notable, a rare resurrection of Xorcist, with his rendition of the title track "Turning Point". Turning Point also marked  a change in the band's core musical direction and creative approach introducing a more abstract, and acoustic based element via Prospero's live show, incorporating guitar, tribal percussion and even bagpipes to the instrument arsenal.

Part of this change was the slow integration of local DJ and music writer Steve Sandford (aka Hangedman) as a permanent member of the band. Initially part of the live show support for EBM fest, Sandford added acoustic tribal percussion, bagpipes and vocals.  Inspired by Prospero, Hangedman abandoned his own solo project V Combust and focused on re-writing material with a mind to the Prospero style and repertoire.

2014 – present day

With the addition of Sandford as a full-time member of the band, and Anderson as the core creative lead, in 2013 the band made a formative trip to Iceland to DJ at a local Reykjavík subculture music night.  Inspired by this trip and along with a live performance at a local Toronto Industrial Noise night Burning Chrome the duo was solidified into Prospero as a two man project with Sandford writing original music alongside Anderson.

In this new incarnation of Prospero, 2014 saw the band releasing Paradise or Apocalypse.  PoA was the fifth full length album with 14 tracks and remixes by Daniel Myer (Haujobb, Architect), iVardensphere, Pulse Plant, and Jonah K. Galvanized by the addition of tribal and folk elements as well as vocals from Sandford and Veela,  Prospero continues to explore new themes while remaining true to their industrial electronic roots.

Members

Core members

Current full time contributors to Prospero are Wade Anderson as creative lead and Steve Sandford (aka Hangedman) as contributing creative composition.

Both work in digital and graphic marketing, both are local Toronto DJs active underground club & fetish scenes

Supporting members

In addition to the core members, Luis Kamakaris has been a long time support on live drums and vocals have been provided by Veela, Tyler Newman (Battery Cage), Ayria and Justin Tripp (Re-Agent). Both Anderson and Sandford take the approach of Prospero being a musical project in the tradition of iVardensphere and welcome side contributors both in the live shows and album releases with many more to come.

Influences

The band's influences are too many to list and delve deep into a vast history of music since the post-punk 1980s period to present.  The best descriptor of musical influences in general is "subculture" music ranging from pioneers such as Front Line Assembly, and Skinny Puppy to more recent bands like iVardensphere.  
A short list of artists among many others are:

 Displacer
 Tonikom
 Front Line Assembly
 Skinny Puppy
 This Morn Omina
 Converter
 Test Department
 Unto Ashes
 Stendeck
 Architect
 iVardensphere
 Jon Hallur
 Xorcist
 s:cage
 Orphx
 Jonah K

Styles and themes

Prospero's music is a fusion of electronic industrial noise marked occasionally acoustic percussion and folk elements.  Genre-wise, they are primarily a tribal / rhythmic noise project.  Prospero explores a juxtaposition between the dystopian future and post apocalyptic themes against an almost folksy, occult influenced misé en scene of mystery and darkness.  With the addition of Sandford the band has skirted with neofolk aspects while retaining a solidly electronic noise presence established since Anderson's foundation. Many of the song titles reference enigmatic mysteries, forgotten places, or cataclysmic scenarios.  Zombies, end of days, inter-stellar voyages, ancient martial references and folk inspired witchcraft are all thematic elements found in Prospero's music.  Politically and sometimes via their music, Prospero is patently anti-racist, anti-homophobic and anti-misogynist at their core.

Discography

Full album releases

 A Storm Is Coming (CDr) (2003)
 Spreading the Infection (2004)
 Folie à Deux - The Elements & The Madness (2008)
 Turning Point (2011)
 Paradise or Apocalypse (2014)
 Typhoid and Swans (2017)

EPs, collaborations and compilations

 Sub.Session – "Storm Front" – Sub.Session – 2002
 Duo.Tone – "The World That I See" – Sub.Session – 2003
 Futursonic Volume 2 – "Karoshi" – Futursonic – 2003
 Saturation Bombing – "Eye Of The Storm" (L'Ombre Remix) – TIK Recordings – 2003
 [tik]co:man:d[sic] – "Insomnia" (Co:Man:D Mix) – TIK Recordings – 2003
 Empusae – Ritual Decay – "Goblins" (Prospero Remix) – Sub.Session – 2003
 Saturation Bombing 2 – Lair's Rosebush - "The Peace Tower" (Prospero's Remix) – TIK  – 2003
 [tik]co:man:d[sic] – s:cage - "Residue" (CMD Mix By Prospero) – TIK Recordings – 2003
 Wumpscut – "Wreath of Barbs" (Prospero Remix) – 2004
 Re_Agent – Abandon – Weak And Wounded (More Lies mix by Prospero) – NXA Records – 2004
 FUCK (First Edition) – Insomnia (Stasis Remix) – Hive Records – 2004
 Interbreeding IV: Gefährlich – Let The Planet Burn – BLC Productions – 2004
 Re: Sound – Insomnia (Manufactura Remix) – Auricle Media, Sub.Session – 2004
 Revelation – Through The Walls – Bugs Crawling Out Of People – 2004
 Saturation Bombing 2 – Extinct – TIK Recordings – 2004
 Extreme Sündenfall 3 – Co:man:d (With Converter) – UpScene – 2005
 [e·vis·cer·ate] – Broadcast From The Coming Dawn – Hive Records – 2005
 Todo Por Nada: 99-05 Collection – Insomnia (Manufactura  Remix) – Auricle Media – 2005
 Converter – Expansion Pack 2.0 – Cloud Eye (Remix By Prospero) – Ant-Zen – 2005
 DYM – Zeno Logic – XI (Prospero’s_Xenomorphic_Remix) – Not On Label  – 2005
 Displacer – Remixes For Free? – Disconnected (Reconnected by Prospero) – Crime League – 2006
 The Other Side – Protection and Precaution – Geska Records – 2006
 Artoffact Records Volume 1 – Let The Planet Burn – Artoffact Records – 2008
 Circumsounds – Contagion & Rebirth – Brume Records, Tympanik Audio – 2008
 Sonic Seducer Vol. 87 – Let The Planet Burn (Still Burning Mix) – Sonic Seducer – 2008
 Fuck It All – Folie à  Deux – Bugs Crawling Out Of People – 2009
 Death of Self – Meaningless (Prospero Remix) – bugs crawling out of people – 2013

Notable live performances

 Krampus Ball III, Toronto, Canada (2014)
 EBMfest 2011, Toronto, Canada (2011)
 DarkRave, 100th anniversary party, Toronto, Canada (2008)
 C.O.M.A. 3 Festival, Montreal, Canada (2006)
 C.O.M.A. 2 Festival, Montreal, Canada (2005)
 Saturation Bombing 2 Festival, Toronto, Canada (2004)
 Saturation Bombing Festival, Toronto, Canada (2003)

External links
Homesite: SpreadingTheInfection.com 
Prospero on discogs.com
Artoffact Records Website

Canadian industrial music groups
Musical groups established in 2000
Musical groups from Toronto
2000 establishments in Ontario